Hopwood is a surname. Notable people with the surname include:
 Arthur Tindell Hopwood (1897-1969), British palaeontologist
 Avery Hopwood, American playwright
 David Hopwood, British geneticist
 John Hopwood, colonial-era settler of Western Pennsylvania
 John Hopwood, English cricketer
 Len Hopwood, English cricketer
 Mererid Hopwood, Welsh poet
 Ronald Arthur Hopwood  (1868–1949), rear admiral, Royal Navy
 Shon Hopwood, American reformed bank robber and self-taught attorney